Bart van Leeuwen (5 February 1950, in Amsterdam – 17 June 2017) was a Dutch photographer and author.

Career
Van Leeuwen published his first pictures in 1967, graduated from the School for Professional Photography in The Hague in 1969 and started to work as a freelance photographer in 1971. Inspired by film noir, Italian neorealism and photographers like Avedon, Brassaï, Frank, Kertész, Lartigue, Newton and Penn he developed a narrative, cinematographic style, linking facts and fiction. He published "Nabelichting", an autobiographical novel, in 2012, and "Niets is Echt", a book about photography and reality, in 2015. Due to a neuromuscular disorder he ceased the creation of new photographic works in 2005 and until his death lived with his wife and son just outside Amsterdam.

Acclaim 

Van Leeuwen has had much critical acclaim over the course of his career. He has received multiple awards and has often been asked to teach by art schools and universities.

Hannah Hör writes:
A fashion photographer who completely rewrote the rules of his trade, using city streets as expressive backdrops, offering an almost casual perspective on cutting-edge fashion designs, and favouring coincidence over carefully crafted poses, Bart van Leeuwen is a master of his profession. His body of work is an intoxicating journey into sensual metropolises like Naples and through fashion capitals such as New York and Paris. The Dutch artist captures the poetic stories of everyday life with cinematographic elegance, drawing inspiration from the contrast-rich style of Film Noir and from Italian neorealism.

[...]

Van Leeuwen's photographic oeuvre is characterised by chance and spontaneity. Whether shooting Andy Warhol during a workout in the factory or capturing Freddy Mercury, Jean-Michel Basquiat, and Grace Jones as they happened to stand opposite him: "I always tried to be open to coincidences, not restricting myself to a pre-defined concept, to find things I wasn’t even looking for but that were actually better than I could have imagined". Van Leeuwen’s photographs can be found in the private collections of fashion designers such as Thierry Mugler or Christian Lacroix, as well as in the Andy Warhol Museum in Pittsburgh.

Publications 

Van Leeuwen has worked for magazines like Avenue, Cosmopolitan, Elle, Esquire, Harpers Bazaar, i-D, Kult, Marie-Claire, Oor, Playboy, Sunday Times, Viva and Wallpaper and companies such as Agnès B, Barclays, Bilderberg, Bijenkorf, CBS, Harrods, ING, Levi's, Matinique, Philips, RCA, René Lezard, Sara Lee, Woolmark and Volvo, shooting fashion stories, advertising campaigns and portraits. Andy Warhol, Bob Geldof, Candy Dulfer, Carice van Houten, Dizzy Gillespie, Dolores Olmedo, Freddie Mercury, Giorgio Armani, Grace Jones, Herman Brood, Jean-Michel Basquiat, Jerry Hall, John Cale, Nina Hagen and Sylvia Kristel are among the celebrities he photographed. Some of Van Leeuwen's published work includes:
Mathilde, Muse, Myth, Mystery. Lisette de Zoete, pgs. 142–145, Lectures, 2016
Nothing is Real, Fact and Photography, Brave New Books, 2015
Everything but Clothes, José Teunissen, Jhim Lamorée, Terra Lannoo, 2015
 APF Magazine Hong Kong, pgs. 45–56, 10/2013
 Aesthetica Magazine, Historic Lifestyles pg. 35, 10 November 2013
 Framed in Print, Janna Laeven, NRC Next, 10 October 2013
 Gup 38, 40 Years of Dutch Magazine Photography, 2013
 Pf Magazine 3, pgs. 30–40, 2013
 Fotofolio – 40 Years of Dutch Magazine Photography, Lectures, 2013
 Fashion Photography in the Netherlands, Irma v. Bommel, pgs. 73–74, 2012
 Avro's Kunstuur TV, Charlotte Ebers, Art 2 Read, 16 June 2012
 NTR Kunststof Radio, Petra Possel, 6 June 2012
 Vrij Nederland 21, Rudie Kagie, pgs. 20–26, 2012
 Vogue NL 2, Fiona Hering, pgs. 164–171, 2012
 Nabelichting, Autobiography, Brouwerij | Brainbooks, 2012
 Luxor Episodes, Jan Damen, 2009
 Avenue, Stijlvol en Werelds, Georgette Koning, NRC Handelsblad, 2006
 Avenue A-Z, Nederlands Fotomuseum, pgs. 117–122, 2006
 Tableau, Fine Arts Magazine 3, pg. 96, 2004
 F.D.Stijl, Frederique Huygen, pg. 20, 2002 
 Tros 2Vandaag TV, Passie voor Pose, 11/2002
 Residence, Marieke van Gessel, pgs. 76–81, 2002
 Creative Red Book 1999/2000 
 Art View, pg. 77, 1999 
 Haute Culture, Mary Hessing, Gisela Prager, 1998
 Beeldspraak, Ton Hendriks, 1995
 Candy Dulfer, Joep Kock, 1994
 Eye to Eye, Henk Gerritsen, 1991
 The Decisive Image, Ingeborg Leijerzapf, 1991
 Modus, Pauline Terreehorst, 1990

Exhibitions 

Van Leeuwen's exhibitions include:
 2017 ONO Arte Contemp, Warhol & Basquiat, Dalla Pop Art alla Street Art, Mantova, It
 2015 The Gallery Club, History of Dutch Magazine Photography, Amsterdam NL
 2015 Museum Arnhem, Everything but Clothes, Arnhem NL
 2014 Christie's, YiP Art, Amsterdam NL
 2013 Foam, Framed in Print, Amsterdam NL
 2010 DFF Gallery, Zoom, Eyes on Dutch Fashion, The Hague NL
 2009 BlowUp Gallery, Uppercuts, Amsterdam NL
 2008 BlowUp Gallery, Dutch Nudes, Amsterdam NL
 2008 BlowUp Gallery, Bart van Leeuwen – 40 Years of Fashion, Amsterdam NL
 2007 Wouter van Leeuwen Gallery, Andy Warhol, Amsterdam NL
 2006 Nederlands Fotomuseum, Avenue A – Z, Rotterdam NL
 2004 Downtown Gallery, BlowUp Photographers, Amsterdam NL
 2004 BlowUp Gallery, Bart van Leeuwen, Amsterdam NL
 2003 Kunsthal, Playboy Photography, Rotterdam NL
 2003 BlowUp Gallery, 11 Photographers, Amsterdam NL
 2003 Naarden Photo, 50 Years Nieuwe Revu, Naarden NL
 2003 Naarden Photo, Style of Life, Naarden NL
 2003 Breda Photo, Breda NL
 2003 Sanoma, Style of Life, Hoofddorp NL
 2003 Christies, Aids Fund, Amsterdam NL
 2002 VNU, 30 x 30, 30 Years Viva, Amsterdam NL
 2002 Downtown Gallery, Pim Thomassen, Amsterdam NL
 2002 Scheringa Museum, 50 Years of Fashion, Spanbroek NL
 2002 Reflections, Urban Perceptions, Amsterdam NL
 2000 Historic Museum, Young, Rotterdam NL
 2000 Museum of Drenthe, Young, Assen NL
 1999 Kring, War Child, Amsterdam NL
 1999 Scheringa Museum, Fong Leng 'Diva', Spanbroek NL
 1999 Lumiere, SVFN, Durgerdam NL
 1998 PanL, Amsterdam NL
 1998 Jablonka Gallery, Andy Warhol, Köln DE
 1998 Westergasfabriek, PanL, Amsterdam NL
 1998 Bijenkorf, Doors to India, Amsterdam NL
 1995 Naarden Photo, Ego Document, Naarden NL
 1995 Dejeuner sur l’Herbe, Paris FR
 1994 European Photography, Yokohama JP
 1993 Naarden Photo, Naarden NL
 1992 St. Lucas Institute, Bruxelles BE
 1992 Kleurgamma, Amsterdam NL
 1991 Naarden Photo, Naarden NL
 1990 Dunhill Dutch Photography, Amstelveen NL
 1989 Dunhill Dutch Photography, Arnhem NL
 1989 Sonesta Gallery, Avenue, Amsterdam NL
 1989 Dunhill Dutch Photography, Assen NL
 1989 Naarden Photo, Naarden NL
 1989 Focus Gallery, Nudes, Amsterdam NL
 1988 Dunhill Dutch Photography, Utrecht NL
 1988 Dunhill Dutch Photography, St. Petersburg RU
 1988 Dunhill Dutch Photography, Moscow RU
 1988 Modam, Amsterdam NL
 1987 Month of Photography, Athens GR
 1987 Dunhill Dutch Photography, Amsterdam NL
 1987 Dunhill Dutch Photography, Amstelveen NL
 1987 Institut Néerlandais, Le Vent du Nord, Paris FR
 1986 Dunhill Dutch Photography, Lelystad NL
 1985 Canon Gallery, 20 Years Avenue, Amsterdam NL
 1985 Aemstelle, Dunhill Dutch Photography, Amstelveen NL
 1984 Kodak Gallery, Odijk NL
 1984 KLM Gallery, Tokio JP
 1983 Mazzo, Amsterdam NL
 1982 KLM Gallery, New York US
 1975 Gallery Fiolet, Amsterdam NL

References

External links

1950 births
2017 deaths
Photographers from Amsterdam
20th-century Dutch photographers